Patrik Raitanen (born 13 June 2001) is a Finnish professional footballer who plays as a defender for Mariehamn on loan from HJK and the Finland national under-20 football team. Raitanen was born in Ulvila, Finland. He made his debut on senior level in FC Jazz, before signing with Liverpool at age 15 in 2017.

Club career

Fortuna Sittard

On 21 June 2019, Raitanen signed his first professional contract with Fortuna Sittard. Raitanen made his professional debut with Fortuna Sittard in a 0-0 Eredivisie tie with Sparta Rotterdam on 28 September 2019.

SPAL

In September 2020 in was announced that Raitanen had signed a deal with Serie B team SPAL and that he would join the U19 team.

HJK Helsinki

On 16 August 2021 HJK announced that Raitanen has signed a contract with the team.

Loan to Mariehamn
On 28 February 2022, Raitanen joined Mariehamn on loan for the 2022 season.

International career

He made his debut on international level on 13 April 2016 playing for Finland national under-15 football team in a match against Poland U15.

Career statistics

Club

Personal life
Raitanen is the son of the Finnish former hockey player Rauli Raitanen.

References

External links

 Fortuna Sittard official profile 
 Patrik Raitanen – SPL competition record
 

2001 births
Living people
People from Ulvila
Finnish footballers
Finland youth international footballers
Association football defenders
Fortuna Sittard players
Klubi 04 players
Helsingin Jalkapalloklubi players
IFK Mariehamn players
Eredivisie players
Finnish expatriate footballers
Expatriate footballers in England
Finnish expatriate sportspeople in England
Expatriate footballers in Italy
Finnish expatriate sportspeople in Italy
Expatriate footballers in the Netherlands
Finnish expatriate sportspeople in the Netherlands
Sportspeople from Satakunta